Firebird (Bonita Juarez) is a fictional superhero character appearing in American comic books published by Marvel Comics. A former member of the Avengers and a member of the Rangers, she exists in Marvel's main shared universe, known as the Marvel Universe. 

Firebird has been described as one Marvel's most notable and powerful Latina heroes.

Publication history

In the story "You Get What You Need!" published in Incredible Hulk vol. 2 #265 (Nov. 1981), writer Bill Mantlo and penciller Sal Buscema created the superhero team the Rangers. The team consists of western characters Bonita Juarez / Firebird, Victoria Starvin / Shooting Star, Drew Daniels / Texas Twister, Hamilton Slade / Phantom Rider then called Night Rider, and William Talltrees, the contemporary Red Wolf. The two women of the team had not previously appeared in comics.

Not long after her first appearance, Firebird appeared several times in the West Coast Avengers title.  She has appeared in several Avengers-related storylines since then.

Fictional character biography

Origins
Bonita Juarez is a Mexican-American woman born in Taos, New Mexico. She was a devout Roman Catholic, who, while walking in the deserts of Albuquerque, New Mexico, came into contact with a radioactive meteorite fragment. The radiation altered her DNA, and gave her the power to generate flames and heat, and even fly. Believing her gifts came from God, she assumed the mythical bird's name, and donned a costume.

As Firebird, she received a distress call from the Avengers, and mistakenly battled the Hulk. She joined with other Southwestern heroes (forming a team called the Rangers) and fought the Corruptor, rescuing Rick Jones in the process, who had actually sent the signal.

West Coast Avengers
Firebird was alone when she fought against the man called Master Pandemonium. Exhausted from her battle, she fell to the ground near the new Avengers Compound on the West Coast, where she was found by the Thing. She enlisted the aid of the Avengers in battling against Master Pandemonium. She assisted the Avengers during the following adventures, and desperately wanted to be invited to join, something to which chairman Hawkeye remained oblivious, since he was trying to recruit the Thing.

Firebird accompanied the Avengers to the dimension of the Cat People. She battled her former teammate in the Rangers, the possessed Shooting Star, alongside the Avengers. She also battled Master Pandemonium again.

When Mockingbird eventually found out Firebird's wish, she tried to coax her husband into inviting her, but he was consistently holding out for the Thing (who did eventually decide to become a member, but backed out before making it official). Frustrated, Firebird left on a spiritual journey. Hawkeye would later change his mind and the Avengers sought out Firebird, but could not find her.

La Espirita
Eventually, she reappeared as La Espirita and arrived in the nick of time to stop Hank Pym's suicide attempt. With the help of Espirita, Hank re-invented himself as the adventurer Doctor Pym, and he was able to move on from his past troubles.

With Henry Pym and Moon Knight, she rescued the Avengers who were trapped in the past. She aided the Avengers in battle with Dominus, and battled Sunstroke.

The two also shared a brief romance, but Bonita left the team again after she helped them out on a few short adventures, to stand by Hank. One of those adventures involved the death of both the East and West Coast Avengers. It was then that she found out that she was seemingly immortal, when all of the Avengers died thanks to a poison by the Elder of the Universe Collector, except her, something that the Collector found fascinating.

Firebird again
Later on Bonita was captured by a group of aliens from the planet Rus, who revealed that the meteorite that gave her amazing powers was allegedly waste material from a discarded alien experiment of a pupil named Yoof. Nonetheless Firebird (she had returned to that name after learning this information) herself believes that her powers are a gift from God. She was called in on various Avengers meetings since then, signifying that she had somewhere accepted their membership offer. 
At first, Bonita was not considered as an Avenger until she attended an all-membership meeting of the Avengers. After that she was called in on various Avengers events. She assisted Hellcat, Monica Rambeau, Moondragon, and Black Widow in subduing the Awesome Android, and encountered a small platoon of Atlanteans in Mexico getting help from a few Avengers. Firebird largely acts as a reserve member, preferring to spend her time as a social worker.

Avengers return
After the return of the main Avengers from the pocket universe created by Franklin Richards most of them were trapped in a curse created by Morgan Le Fay where she served in a guard called Queen's Vengeance under the name Firemaiden

Her immunity to radiation later made her indispensable when a mysterious energy field engulfed a small Russian country and turned everyone into zombies during the first blows of the Kang War. Firebird was one of the few individuals who could travel into the energy field without harm. Fellow Avenger Thor also surmised that Firebird may be immortal. When Captain America is briefly transformed into an energy zombie, Thor, briefly believing him dead, begins to fear that he has become too close to his mortal comrades despite his knowledge that he would outlive them when forced to face such vivid evidence of his allies' mortality, and contemplates leaving the Avengers after the war was over.

Although troubled by the implications of her own apparent immortality for her faith, Firebird helped him to see that the bonds between him and the Avengers were so valuable precisely because they wouldn't last forever and he shouldn't neglect them just because he would outlive them. In recognition of her advice, Thor toasted her when he arranged for Asgardian cooks to prepare a feast for the Avengers to celebrate Kang's defeat, commenting that she had taught a god a lesson by treating him as the fool he was.

Beyond!
Firebird reappears in the limited series Beyond! along with other Marvel characters. She is depicted as having changed to a somewhat more revealing costume that bares part of her midriff. She is also shown to have a romantic attraction to Henry Pym which manifests when she kisses him after he has an argument with the Wasp.

Civil War
After a vicious battle between Captain America's Secret Avengers and Iron Man's Pro-Registration forces during the Civil War, in which Bill Foster was killed by a clone of The Mighty Thor, Firebird, along with twenty other superheroes, joined the Secret Avengers in opposing the Superhuman Registration Act. Captain America's dialogue implies that the new members, including Firebird, are registered heroes who have nonetheless turned against Iron Man's forces because of the Bill Foster debacle. Weeks after the conclusion to the Civil War, Firebird is seen as one of the members of the revived Rangers, as part of the 50 States Initiative Program.

Bonita has been identified as one of the 142 registered superheroes who appear on the cover of the comic book Avengers: The Initiative #1.

In Avengers: The Initiative #2 she is seen attacking HYDRA along with the Rangers.

Secret Invasion 
During the Secret Invasion storyline, Firebird was with the Rangers when they, Delroy Garrett / 3-D Man, and Eric O'Grady / Ant-Man were fighting a Skrull that was posing as Lobo, Red Wolf's wolf. The Rangers come into conflict with Kaine, alias Scarlet Spider in Houston, then they joined forces with him to battle a monster made of pure energy.

Powers and abilities
Bonita Juarez gained superhuman powers due to bombardment by radiation from a meteorite containing energy waste from an alien's scientific equipment. As Firebird, she has the power of pyrokinesis, which enables her to mentally excite the atoms in an object until it spontaneously combusts. By using her powers to ignite the air around her, she can surround herself with an aura of flames that often takes the shape of a bird, and if she focuses her flames downwards in a tight stream, she can propel herself through the air like a rocket. She can channel her powers through her hands to seemingly project searing thermal blasts from her body (actually from her mind), capable of melting steel. She can fly by riding wind currents stirred up by the nimbus of fire with which she surrounds herself while flying. Although she can propel herself at superhuman speeds, she cannot breathe at those speeds without skin protection and an oxygen supply. Fatigue impairs her performance after approximately one hour of peak expenditure of power.

She has also displayed a limited power of precognition, allowing her to have glimpses of the future.

Firebird also seems to be immune to most forms of radiation and poison (and even demonic possession) as well as the physical effects of her mental powers, and has displayed the ability to survive in the vacuum of space. Firebird may be immortal, but the precise details of this are unclear beyond the fact that she has twice survived apparently fatal attacks that only Thor - himself an immortal - could withstand.

Reception

Accolades 

 In 2015, BuzzFeed ranked Firebird 7th in their "15 Incredible Latino Superheroes You Need To Know" list.
 In 2020, CBR.com ranked Firebird 9th in their "13 Most Powerful Hispanic Heroes In Marvel Comics" list.
 In 2020, Scary Mommy included Firebird in their "Looking For A Role Model? These 195+ Marvel Female Characters Are Truly Heroic" list.
 In 2022, Screen Rant included Firebird in their "10 Iconic West Coast Avengers" list, in their "9 Strongest West Coast Avengers" list, and in their "10 Female Marvel Heroes That Should Come To The MCU" list.

Other versions

MC2
In the MC2 universe, Firebird was killed in the final mission of the original Avengers.

Marvel Zombies
In the Marvel Zombies universe, Firebird is one of the heroes changed into a zombie.

References

External links
 
 
 
 The Women of Marvel Comics Firebird Page

Avengers (comics) characters
Characters created by Bill Mantlo
Characters created by Sal Buscema
Comics characters introduced in 1981
Fictional characters from New Mexico
Fictional characters with fire or heat abilities
Fictional characters with precognition
Marvel Comics American superheroes
Marvel Comics female superheroes
Marvel Comics mutates
Mexican superheroes